Chenyang Xu (born 1981) is a Chinese mathematician in the area of algebraic geometry and a professor at Princeton University. Xu is known for his work in birational geometry, the minimal model program, and the K-stability of Fano varieties.

Career 
After completing his PhD doctorate at Princeton under János Kollár's supervision, Xu joined MIT as a CLE Moore Instructor between 2008-2011. After a promotion to assistant professor at the University of Utah, Xu returned to Peking University in 2012 to join the Beijing International Center of Mathematical Research, subsequently promoted to professor in 2013. 

In 2018, Xu joined the mathematics faculty at MIT as Professor. 

In 2020, Xu moved to Princeton University as Professor.

Awards
In 2016, he was announced as a winner of the ICTP Ramanujan Prize for that year, "in recognition of Xu's outstanding works in algebraic geometry, notably in the area of birational geometry, including works both on log canonical pairs and on Q-Fano varieties, and on the topology of singularities and their dual complexes." 

He is one of five winners of the 2019 New Horizons Prize for Early-Career Achievement in Mathematics, associated with the Breakthrough Prize in Mathematics for his research in the minimal model program and applications to the moduli of algebraic varieties.

He was elected as a Fellow of the American Mathematical Society in the 2020 Class, for "contributions to algebraic geometry, in particular the minimal model program and the K-stability of Fano varieties". In 2021, he received the Cole Prize in Algebra from the AMS.

Selected publications
 C. D. Hacon, C. Xu (2013). "Existence of log canonical closures", Inventiones Mathematicae 192 (1), 161–195 49
 C. D. Hacon, J. McKernan, C. Xu (2014). "ACC for log canonical thresholds", Annals of Mathematics 180 (2), 523–571 47

References

External links
Beijing International Center of Mathematics Research

1981 births
Living people
Algebraic geometers
Princeton University alumni
Massachusetts Institute of Technology School of Science faculty
Academic staff of Peking University
Peking University alumni
Mathematicians from Chongqing
Educators from Chongqing
Chinese science writers
Writers from Chongqing
Fellows of the American Mathematical Society